The Pazhuvettaraiyar were feudatories of the medieval Cholas. They ruled over the areas of Kila-Paluvur, Mela-Paluvur and Keezhaiyur in the Udaiyarpalayam taluk of the Ariyalur district. They were responsible for a number of benefactions to the temples at this place and were known to have been related to the Cholas by marriage.

Origin 
According to the Anbil plates of Sundara Chola, his paternal grandmother, that is the queen of Parantaka I and the mother of Arinjaya Chola was of Pazhuvettaraiyar family. She is therein described as the daughter of a  Chera mandala prince called Paluvettaraiyar. So it can be safely concluded that they were of Chera origin. However it is not clear if they were already in possession of the areas of Kilapaluvur, Melapaluvur and Keezhaiyur or if they were granted these dominions after their alliance with the Cholas.

Reference in South Indian inscriptions

About a dozen records pertaining to this dynasty have been found. Pazhuvettaraiyar was a Kerala prince who figures largely in the inscriptions copied at Kila-paaluvur and Mela-paluvur in Tiruchirapalli district A.R. No. 231 of 1926 dated in te 12th year of Paranthaka. One of the records (A.R. No. 231 of 1926) dated in the 12th year of Parantaka, states that Paluvettaraiyar Kandan Amudanar fought, on behalf of his Chola overlord, a victorious battle at Vellur against the forces of the Pandya king and his Ceylonese ally, in which the Pandya lost his life. To commemorate this success the Commander Nakkan Sattan of Paradur made a gift of a perpetual lamp to the temple of Tiruvalandurai-Mahadeva at Siru-Paluvur.

It is perhaps this Amudanar who is referred to in the Anbil Plates of Sundara Chola as a Kerala prince whose daughter was married to Parantaka I and bore him prince Arinjaya. The term ‘Kerala prince’ probably meant that he was a relative of the Chera king.

Other chiefs from this family include Kumaran Maravan and Kumaran Kandan. They are credited with the building of the Twin Temples of Keezhaiyur, a 9th century temple complex.

Pazhuvettaraiyar Regiment 

The Pazhuvettaraiyar regiment was a military regiment which was involved in the invasion of Sri Lanka by Cholas in the 10th century.

References

See also 
Chola

People from Tiruchirappalli district